The 2019 Ohio Valley Conference women's soccer tournament was the postseason women's soccer tournament for the Ohio Valley Conference held from November 1 through November 10, 2019. The first round and quarterfinals of the tournament were held at campus sites hosted by the #3 and #4 seeds, while the semifinals and final took place at Houck Stadium in Cape Girardeau, Missouri. The eight-team single-elimination tournament consisted of four rounds based on seeding from regular season conference play. The Murray State Racers were the defending champions and did not defend their title, losing to eventual champions Belmont 2–1 in the Semifinals.  Belmont went on to beat SIUE on penalties in the final.  The conference tournament title was the first for the Belmont women's soccer program and the first for head coach Heather Henson.

Bracket

Source:

Schedule

First Round

Quarterfinals

Semifinals

Final

Statistics

Goalscorers 
3 Goals
 Julie Garst (Belmont)

2 Goals
 Bella Roberts (UT Martin)

1 Goal
 Hailey Block (Southeast Missouri)
 Niki Clements (Belmont)
 Sarah DeWolf (Eastern Illinois)
 Megan Keeven (SIUE)
 Mackenzie Litzsinger (SIUE)
 Avery Nowak (Belmont)
 Rachel Vernon (Belmont)
 Miyah Watford (Murray State)
 Victoria Wharton (Eastern Illinois)

Own Goals
 Eastern Illinois vs. SIUE

All-Tournament team

Source:

MVP in bold

References 

Ohio Valley Conference Women's Soccer Tournament
2019 Ohio Valley Conference women's soccer season